Abagrotis brunneipennis, the Yankee dart, is a moth of the family Noctuidae. The species was first described by Augustus Radcliffe Grote in 1875. It is found in North America from Newfoundland west to Vancouver Island, south to west central Oregon, Utah, Colorado and North Carolina.

Adults are on wing in August to September in one generation.

The larvae feed on various woody plants, including Vaccinium. They also feed on fallen leaves during the winter.

References

brunneipennis
Moths of North America
Moths described in 1875